Mickey C. McGuire (born January 18, 1941) is an American former professional baseball player. He was born in Dayton, Ohio.

In a two-season career, McGuire was a .190 hitter (4-for-21) with two runs and two RBI in 16 games. He did not register an extra-base hit.

See also
 1962 Baltimore Orioles season
 1967 Baltimore Orioles season
 Baltimore Orioles all-time roster

References

External links

Retrosheet

1941 births
Living people
Aberdeen Pheasants players
African-American baseball players
American expatriate baseball players in Japan
Ardmore Rosebuds players
Baltimore Orioles players
Baseball players from Dayton, Ohio
Elmira Pioneers players
Hiroshima Toyo Carp players
Major League Baseball second basemen
Major League Baseball shortstops
Rochester Red Wings players
Seattle Angels players
Tucson Toros players
Victoria Rosebuds players